Andrew Charles Thorn (born 12 November 1966) is an English football manager and former professional footballer. He was most recently the manager of Kidderminster Harriers.

As a player, he was a defender from 1984 until 1998. Whilst with Wimbledon, he was part of the side that achieved the famous victory over Liverpool in the 1988 FA Cup Final. He also played in the 1990 FA Cup Final for Crystal Palace, although this time ended up on the losing side. He also played for Newcastle United, Hearts and Tranmere Rovers.

Club career
Thorn began a playing career with Wimbledon in 1984, playing as a traditional English centre half in the Crazy Gang, alongside Dennis Wise, Lawrie Sanchez and Vinnie Jones. During his initial period at the club he played 107 league games, scoring twice, and also winning five England U21 caps. One of his league goals for the Dons was their first in the First Division after promotion in 1986, a consolation goal in a 3–1 opening day defeat to Manchester City at Maine Road.

Thorn left Wimbledon in 1988 to play for Newcastle United. Although he stayed at St James' Park for only one year, he was nevertheless a mainstay in the starting line-up during the 1988–89 season, before moving on to Crystal Palace in November 1989, where he is now remembered as a legend.

He was credited with improving a poor defence, helping secure Palace's top-flight status for four successive seasons. He appeared in Palace's first Cup Final; the 1990 FA Cup Final.

He returned to Wimbledon in 1994, playing 37 league games in two seasons before moving to Scottish Premier League side Heart of Midlothian, where he played a handful of games, and then finally to Tranmere Rovers, before retiring prematurely in 1998 due to a knee injury, aged 31.

Managerial career
Thorn joined Coventry City as chief scout before becoming caretaker-manager alongside Steve Harrison after Aidy Boothroyd's departure. Coventry enjoyed a successful close to the season under his leadership, losing only one game against Middlesbrough. His first game as the official manager of the club was the final home game of the 2010–2011 season against Reading.

However, the 2011–2012 season saw Coventry relegated to the Football League First Division following a home defeat by Doncaster Rovers on 21 April 2012. Thorn claimed an inability to buy new players and conflict at boardroom level had been major contributors towards Coventry's relegation. The club agreed to keep Thorn to oversee their promotion campaign back to the Championship for the forthcoming 2012–13 season. However, Thorn was sacked as manager on 26 August 2012 after a 2–2 home draw against Bury in which Coventry lost a two-goal advantage in the second half and were booed off at the end of the game.

On 8 January 2014, Thorn was appointed manager of Kidderminster Harriers. On 5 March, after less than two months in the role, Thorn was sacked.

Personal life
Thorn has a daughter, Olivia, and son, Jack, who plays for Aberystwyth Town as a midfielder.

References

External links

1966 births
Living people
Footballers from Carshalton
English footballers
Association football defenders
Wimbledon F.C. players
Newcastle United F.C. players
Crystal Palace F.C. players
Heart of Midlothian F.C. players
Tranmere Rovers F.C. players
English Football League players
Premier League players
Scottish Football League players
England under-21 international footballers
English football managers
Coventry City F.C. managers
Kidderminster Harriers F.C. managers
English Football League managers
National League (English football) managers
FA Cup Final players